Kim Dong Chul (born 1953) is a Korean-American businessman who was imprisoned by the government of North Korea (DPRK) in October 2015 and sentenced to 10 years of hard labor for alleged espionage. Kim was one of three U.S. citizens imprisoned in that country to be released on May 9, 2018. The others were Tony Kim, also known as Kim Sang-duk (arrested on April 21, 2017), and Kim Hak-Song (arrested on May 7, 2017).

Life before captivity 
Kim Dong Chul is a naturalized U.S. citizen of Korean origin. Once a resident of Fairfax, Virginia, Kim had been living in China with his wife, and owns a business in a special economic zone of the DPRK.

Imprisonment in North Korea 
It has been claimed that Kim was a Christian, and involved in missionary work.

Kim was arrested in October 2015. His status was not publicly known until January 2016, when DPRK introduced him to a CNN crew visiting Pyongyang. CNN was allowed to interview Kim, but only through an interpreter. In March 2016, he appeared at a government-arranged news conference in Pyongyang and "apologized for trying to steal military secrets in collusion with South Koreans"; the South Korean authorities have denied any involvement. In April 2016, North Korea sentenced Kim to 10 years of hard labor for espionage and other crimes.

Kim's arrest and captivity, according to Russell Goldman of The New York Times, followed a pattern also seen with other detentions of U.S. nationals by North Korea: "A forced confession, a show trial, a sentence to years of hard labor with little chance of appeal."

Release 
On May 9, 2018, several news outlets reported that Kim and fellow American detainees Kim Sang-duk and Kim Hak Song had been granted amnesty following a meeting between Supreme Leader Kim Jong-un and United States Secretary of State Mike Pompeo in Pyongyang to discuss details of the planned summit between Kim and President Donald Trump. The three men, alongside Pompeo, landed at Andrews Air Force Base shortly before 3 am eastern on May 10, thereby concluding a 17-month struggle by the Trump Administration to secure their release. A subsequent joint statement by the three men, and released via the State Department, states: 'We would like to express our deep appreciation to the United States government, President Trump, Secretary Pompeo, and the people of the United States for bringing us home...We thank God, and all our families and friends who prayed for us and for our return. God Bless America, the greatest nation in the world.'

Admission of espionage 

In an interview with NK News published on July 29, 2019, Kim admitted that he was spying for the American CIA and South Korean NIS since 2009.

See also 
List of foreign nationals detained in North Korea

References 

American people imprisoned abroad
American people of Korean descent
American businesspeople
Prisoners and detainees of North Korea
Living people
1953 births
People from Fairfax, Virginia
South Korean emigrants to the United States
Naturalized citizens of the United States